The Admiral Danish Fleet (ADMDANFLT) was the operationally supreme organisation of the Royal Danish Navy between 1 January 1991 and 30 September 2014.

History
In 1961, following major restructuring of the Danish Navy, it was decide to collect all daily operational tasks under one command. 

Following the 1988 Defence Commission, it was decided that the positions of Inspector of the Navy would be removed and the chief of the Admiral Danish Fleet would become the new Chief of the Royal Danish Navy.

Commanders

References
Citations

Bibliography

External links
 Admiral Danish Fleet website

Royal Danish Navy
Military units and formations of Denmark